Sarcogyne is a genus of crustose lichens in the family Acarosporaceae. It was circumscribed by German botanist Julius von Flotow in 1850. A proposal has been put forth in 2021 to assign Sarcogyne clavus as the type species of the genus, "as it represents the original concept of Sarcogyne as having melanized lecideine apothecia without algae in the margin".

Species
, Species Fungorum accepts 26 species of Sarcogyne.

Sarcogyne albothallina 
Sarcogyne alcesensis 
Sarcogyne arenosa 
Sarcogyne bernardinensis 
Sarcogyne brunnea 
Sarcogyne canadensis 
Sarcogyne canberrensis 
Sarcogyne clavus 
Sarcogyne convexa 
Sarcogyne crustacea 
Sarcogyne desolata 
Sarcogyne endopetrophila 
Sarcogyne hypophaea 
Sarcogyne iridana 
Sarcogyne lapponica 
Sarcogyne magnispora 
Sarcogyne maritima 
Sarcogyne meridionalis 
Sarcogyne mitziae 
Sarcogyne molongloensis 
Sarcogyne oceanica 
Sarcogyne paradoxa 
Sarcogyne parviascifera 
Sarcogyne porphyricola 
Sarcogyne praetermissa 
Sarcogyne pruinosa 
Sarcogyne reebiae 
Sarcogyne regularis 
Sarcogyne saphyniana 
Sarcogyne sekikaica 
Sarcogyne similis 
Sarcogyne squamosa 
Sarcogyne terrulenta 
Sarcogyne tholifera 
Sarcogyne ulleungdoensis 
Sarcogyne wheeleri

Gallery

References

Acarosporales
Lecanoromycetes genera
Lichen genera
Taxa named by Julius von Flotow
Taxa described in 1850